Kieron Davies (born 18 August 1980) is a German international rugby union player of Welsh descent, playing for Ampthill & District RFC and the German national rugby union team. His brother, Domenick Davies, is also a German international.

He has played Rugby since 1987.

In 2009-10, he was the leading points scorers in the National League 3 Midlands with 234 points. In 2010-11, the club, with Davies, plays in the National League 3 London & SE.

Honours

National team
 European Nations Cup - Division 2
 Champions: 2008

Club
 National League 3 Midlands
 Champions: 2010

Stats
Kieron Davies's personal statistics in club and international rugby:

Club

 As of 13 December 2010

National team

European Nations Cup

Friendlies & other competitions

 As of 8 April 2012

References

External links
 Kieron Davies at scrum.com
   Kieron Davies at totalrugby.de

1980 births
Living people
Welsh rugby union players
German rugby union players
Germany international rugby union players
Welsh people of German descent
DRC Hannover players
Rugby union fullbacks
Welsh expatriate sportspeople in Germany
Welsh expatriate sportspeople in France
German expatriate sportspeople in France
Welsh expatriate rugby union players
German expatriate rugby union players
Expatriate rugby union players in France
Bedford Blues players